Stick dance may refer to:
 Stick dance (African-American), a dance developed by American slaves
 Emirati stick dance, a traditional group dance of United Arab Emirates and Oman
 Ball de bastons, a European ritual dance
 Dandiya Raas, a dance of Gujarat origin
 Jocul cu bâtă, a Romanian folk dance
 Laathi nach, also known as the Tharu stick dance
 Soke (dance), a Tongan folk dance
 Tahtib, an Egyptian folk dance
 Tirere, a dance in Kiribati